Nepal Mandala is an ancient confederation on the Indian subcontinent, marked by cultural, religious and political boundaries which lies in present-day central Nepal. It consists of the Kathmandu Valley and surrounding areas. The rule of the indigenous Newars in Nepal Mandala ended with its conquest by the Gorkha Kingdom and the rise of the Shah dynasty in 1768.

According to the Outline History of Nepal, Nepal consisted of three kingdoms during the early medieval period: Khas in the west, Karnatak in the south and Nepal Mandala in the center.

Bhaktapur was the capital of Nepal Mandala until the 15th century when three capitals, including Kathmandu and Lalitpur, were established.
Regions of Nepal

Cultural area

The extent of Nepal Mandala has been traditionally defined by the locations of 64 Hindu and 24 Buddhist pilgrimage sites. The Hindu shrines consist of 64 Shiva lingas scattered from Brahmeswar in Nuwakot district in the west to Bhimeswar in Dolakha District in the east.

The 24 Buddhist pilgrimage sites are spread from the Trishuli River in the west to Dolalghat in the east. When seen as an ordered pattern, they form the picture of the mandala of Chakrasamvara, the principal deity of Vajrayana Buddhism. Nepal Mandala was conceived on the basis of the Chakrasamvara Mandala.

Francis Buchanan-Hamilton has written in An Account of the Kingdom Of Nepal published in 1819 that four pilgrimage spots marked the boundaries of Nepal Proper: Nilkantha (an eight-day journey north from Kathmandu), Nateswar (three days to the south), Kaleswar (two days to the west) and Bhimeswar (four days to the east).

Political area

The term mandala also means a country, and it has been used to represent traditional political formations such as federation of kingdoms. The area comprising Kathmandu, Lalitpur, Bhaktapur and Dolakha during the Malla period is generally known as Nepal Mandala.

According to the Outline History of Nepal, Nepal Mandala was situated between the Khas and Simraungarh kingdoms. The Khas kingdom extended from Garhwal in the west to the Trishuli River in the east, and from Lake Manasarovar in the north to the Terai in the south. Karnataka, also called Simraungarh, was situated in the Terai.

Western travelers in the late 18th century have written that Nepal's borders extended to Tibet in the north, the nation of the Kirata in the east, the kingdom of Makwanpur in the south and the Trishuli River in the west which separated it from the kingdom of Gorkha.

In 1661, Jesuit Fathers Johann Grueber and Albert d'Orville travelled from Tibet to India through Nepal. They mentioned in their report that they passed through "Cuthi", the first town in the kingdom of "Necbal" (Nepal), and arrived in "Cadmendu" (Kathmandu), the capital of "Necbal". From "Cadmendu", a journey of five days brings one to "Hedouda", a market town in the kingdom of "Maranga". The town of Hedouda is known as Hetauda today.

The inhabitants

The oldest inhabitants of Nepal Mandala are the Newars who are of multiple racial strains that combined over millennia. Newar civilization is a blend of different cultures that came together in Nepal Mandala. According to sociologists, the people of Nepal gradually became known as Newar during the fifteenth century under the reign of Pratap Malla of Kathmandu.

History

The Buddhist text Manjushrimula Kalpa has mentioned Manadeva (reigned 464-506 AD) as being the king of Nepal Mandala. The term Nepal Mandala also appears in the popular Buddhist text Swayambhu Purana. It occurs in a stone inscription at Gyaneswar, Kathmandu dating from the eighth century during the reign of Licchavi king Jayadeva II. Legends also speak about the fact that old Kirati kings offered the throne of the Mandala to the Shakya clan, the clan attributed to the origins of Buddhism.

The term Nepal Mandala has been used through the centuries in stone and copper inscriptions and the colophons of manuscripts when mentioning the dedicator's address. It is also referred to during important Buddhist ceremonies.

See also

Mandala (Southeast Asian history)

References

Further reading
Slusser, Mary Shepherd. Nepal Mandala: A Cultural Study of the Kathmandu Valley (Two Volumes), Princeton University Press 1982. 
Pruscha, Carl. Kathmandu Valley - The Preservation of Physical Environment and Cultural Heritage - A Protective Inventory, Vol. 2, Wien 1975

History of Nepal
Geography of Nepal
Regions of Asia
Newar
Former kingdoms
Cultural history of Nepal